Rogerstown Estuary is a sea inlet and estuary in Ireland. It is a designated nature reserve, Special Area of Conservation, and a Ramsar site.

The main flow into the estuary comes from the Ballyboghil River and its terminal tributary, the Corduff Stream.  Other watercourses entering the estuary include one from Portrane, Balleally Stream, and also Bride's Stream and Jone's Stream, from the Lusk area, and a number of small flows. 

The estuary is made up of saltwater marshes, raised salt marsh, wet meadows and riverine shallows and creeks.

It is internationally recognised as one of the most important east coast sites and is vital for wintering wildfowl and waders and birds on passage. Birds come to the estuary from the Arctic. It supports an internationally important population of Brent Geese and a further 14 species in numbers of national importance. The former Balleally landfill site located by the railway causeway was landscaped and reopened as Rogerstown Park in 2019.

The site is a statutory Nature Reserve and a candidate Special Area of Conservation under the E.U. Habitats Directive. 

The estuary's mouth separates the beaches of Portrane and Rush, and the mouth is so narrow, it is theorised that a person would be able to cross from Rush to Portrane at a gradual walking pace, within a time span of less than a minute, if there was no water. According to local legend, there was once a bridge across the mouth, however, it was dismantled after various suicides. An apparent remain of this bridge still exists today, on the beach at Portrane.

The townland of Turvey touches on the estuary. It is associated with the Goban Saor described as the son of Tuirbe Tragmar ("thrower of axes"), a figure whose magical axe would hold back the sea after it was thrown on the strand. This feat was said to have been performed at Tráig Tuirbi, Tuirbe's Strand or Turvey.

References

Landforms of Fingal
Estuaries of Ireland
Drainage basins of the Irish Sea
Bodies of water of the Republic of Ireland
Nature reserves in the Republic of Ireland
Special Areas of Conservation in the Republic of Ireland
Ramsar sites in the Republic of Ireland
Nethercross